Matanuska–Susitna College in Palmer, Alaska, north of Anchorage, is part of the University of Alaska Anchorage system. The college began in 1958 as Palmer Community College, changing its name in 1963 to correspond to the Matanuska-Susitna Borough where it is located. It is commonly called Mat-Su College. Total enrollment is about 1,800 students per semester. Dr. Talis Colberg was appointed as the fourth Director of the College in 2010. Dr. Colberg has since announced he will be retiring in October 2023.

Academics

Associate degree programs
Matanuska–Susanna College (Mat-Su College) is an extended campus of the University of Alaska - Anchorage. The college offers two-year associate degree programs. Students may take courses that lead to an Associate of Arts or an Associate of Applied Science degree in the following areas:

Accounting
Associate of Arts
Computer Systems Technology
Human Services
Refrigeration & Heating Technology
Small Business Administration
Telecommunications Electronics & Computer Technology
Information Technology Specialist (via University of Alaska Fairbanks)
Paramedical Technology
Sustainable Energy
General Business

Vocational programs
Many students at Matanuska–Susitna College attend its vocational education classes. It offers professional certification in:

Computer Information & Office Systems
Computer & Networking Technology (CISCO)
Refrigeration & Heating Technology
Information Technology Specialist (via University of Alaska Fairbanks)
Veterinary Assisting
Sustainable Energy

In addition, Matanuska–Susitna College offers numerous community enrichment programs, such as watercolor painting, metalsmithing, knifemaking, and pottery. The Mat-Su Community Choir also has classes and recitals in the College.

Buildings
The Matanuska–Susitna College campus sits on a  area. The college has five main buildings, comprising a  facility:

Fred and Sara Machetanz Building is referred to as "FSM."  It contains all of the Art classes, most Social Sciences classes, Computer Information Office Systems classes,  and the Student Services offices. It is named after Fred and Sara Machetanz, who donated large amounts of land to Mat-Su College; both received meritorious service awards from Mat-Su College in 1987. Fred Machetanz, who also received an honorary degree from Mat-Su in 1973, was a well-known and highly respected Alaskan artist. Numerous paintings of his can be viewed throughout the FSM. A portrait of Fred Machetanz hangs near the Student Services office. The upper floor of the FSM building houses the art studio and art history classroom. The MatSu College art program consists of beginner, intermediate, and advanced courses. Fred Machetanz studied with Maxfield Parrish, N.C. Wyeth, and Norman Rockwell. His technique of underpainting (as some of the Renaissance Masters painted) is one of the many painting techniques taught at the college.  
Jalmar Kerttula Building is referred to as "JKB."  It is where most English, Computer Network Support, & Biology classes are held. It also houses the Academic Affairs office, Director's Office, Marketing, Student Government office, and Bookstore. A local state representative, Jalmar "Jay" Kerttula served in the Alaska Legislature for more than 30 years.
The Alvin S. Okeson Library or OLB; is the academic library. The library building also houses the Testing and Learning Center. It is named after a founder of the college. The library's collections include more than 45,000 items, including books, maps, videos, and CDs, and 80 periodicals in print format, with access to several thousand more.
Snodgrass Agricultural Science Building is referred to as Snodgrass Hall or Snod for short.  Most mathematics and science classes are held there. It also houses the Paramedic Program, and will be housing the University of Alaska Anchorage School of Nursing after the expansion is complete. It is named after State Department of Agriculture Director Roland Snodgrass, who is often called the "Father of Alaskan Agriculture".
Glenn Massay Theater is referred to as the Massay ('mass-ee') theater or simply the theater.  The Massay Theater is a 520-seat performing arts theater and the newest addition to the Mat-Su College, having opened February 2015.  It is named after past director Glenn Massay, who in addition to serving as campus director for years was a supporter of and amateur performer in local theater.  The Glenn Massay Theater was constructed for the purpose of hosting large scale theater productions, musical performances, film festivals, and lectures.

Notable alumni
 Sarah Palin – former Governor and Vice Presidential candidate, took one class at the college in the fall of 1985

References

Buildings and structures in Matanuska-Susitna Borough, Alaska
Educational institutions established in 1958
University of Alaska Anchorage
Community colleges in Alaska
Education in Matanuska-Susitna Borough, Alaska
1958 establishments in Alaska